Welisson Rosa da Silva (born November 22, 1983 in Viçosa, Minas Gerais) is a Brazilian weightlifter. He represented Brazil at the 2008 Summer Olympics in Beijing, where he placed eighteenth in the men's lightweight category (69 kg), with a snatch of 135 kg, and a clean and jerk of 155 kg, for a total of 290 kg.

References

External links
NBC 2008 Olympics profile

1983 births
Living people
Brazilian male weightlifters
Olympic weightlifters of Brazil
Weightlifters at the 2008 Summer Olympics
Weightlifters at the 2016 Summer Olympics
Sportspeople from Minas Gerais
21st-century Brazilian people